Corymbia setosa, commonly known as the rough leaved bloodwood or desert bloodwood, is a species of small tree that is endemic to north-eastern Australia. It has rough, tessellated brown bark on the trunk and branches, a crown of juvenile, heart-shaped leaves arranged in opposite pairs, flower buds in groups of three or seven, white flowers and urn-shaped to shortened spherical fruit.

Description
It has rough, deeply tessellated brownish bark on the trunk and branches and a sparse canopy. Flowering has been observed in June, September and November and the flowers are white.

Taxonomy and naming
This eucalypt was first formally described in 1843 by Johannes Conrad Schauer in Walpers' book Repertorium Botanices Systematicae and given the name Eucalyptus setosa from specimens collected by Ferdinand Bauer. In 1995 Ken Hill and Lawrie Johnson changed the name to Corymbia setosa. The specific epithet (setosa) is from the Latin word setosus meaning "bristly".

In the same journal, Hill and Johnson described two subspecies, pedicellaris and subspecies setosa but the names are not accepted by the Australian Plant Census.

Distribution and habitat
Corymbia setosa grows on rocky hills and red sandy plains, but not extending to wet tropical areas. It is found from Tennant Creek, Northern Territory, Daly Waters and the Barkly Tableland in the Northern Territory and east into the Gulf of Carpentaria hinterland and islands, to the Musgrave area of Cape York Peninsula and as far south as Barcaldine in Queensland.

In a woodland setting, associated species include Erythrophleum chlorostachys, Eucalyptus foelscheana, Xanthostemon paradoxus, Eucalyptus confertiflora and Eucalyptus latifolia in the overstorey and Grevillea decurrens, Gardenia megasperma and Calytrix exstipulata in the sparsely vegetated understorey.

Conservation status
This species of eucalypt is classified as of "least concern" under the Queensland Government Nature Conservation Act 1992.

See also
List of Corymbia species

References

setosa
Myrtales of Australia
Flora of Queensland
Flora of the Northern Territory
Plants described in 1843
Taxa named by Johannes Conrad Schauer